Gjerset is a Norwegian surname. Notable people with the surname include:

Knut Gjerset (1865–1936), Norwegian-born American writer and historian
Oluf Gjerset (1848–1941), Norwegian-born American politician

Norwegian-language surnames